Eligio Caracciolo, C.R. (1654 – 17 October 1700) was a Roman Catholic prelate who served as Archbishop of Cosenza (1694–1700).

Biography
Eligio Caracciolo was born in Naples, Italy in 1654 and ordained a priest in the Congregation of Clerics Regular of the Divine Providence.
On 15 March 1694, he was appointed during the papacy of Pope Innocent XII as Archbishop of Cosenza.
On 21 March 1694, he was consecrated bishop by Fabrizio Spada, Cardinal-Priest of San Crisogono with Michelangelo Mattei, Titular Patriarch of Antioch, and Giovanni Battista Visconti Aicardi, Bishop of Novara, serving as co-consecrators. 
He served as Archbishop of Cosenza until his death on 17 October 1700.

References

External links and additional sources
 (for Chronology of Bishops) 
 (for Chronology of Bishops) 

17th-century Italian Roman Catholic archbishops
Bishops appointed by Pope Innocent XII
1654 births
1700 deaths
Clergy from Naples
Theatine bishops